USS Baltimore (SSN-704), a -class nuclear-powered attack submarine, was the sixth ship of the United States Navy to be named for Baltimore, Maryland. The contract to build her was awarded to the Electric Boat Division of General Dynamics Corporation in Groton, Connecticut on 31 October 1973 and her keel was laid down on 21 May 1979.  She was launched on 13 December 1980 sponsored by Congresswoman Marjorie S. Holt, and commissioned on 24 July 1982. The vessel's logo was "From Sails to Atoms," as inscribed on the ships original plaque.

Baltimore was decommissioned and stricken from the Naval Vessel Register on 10 July 1998. Ex-Baltimore is scheduled to be disposed of through the Nuclear Powered Ship and Submarine Recycling Program in Bremerton, Washington.

External links

Los Angeles-class submarines
Cold War submarines of the United States
Nuclear submarines of the United States Navy
1980 ships
Ships built in Groton, Connecticut